The Secular Institute Pius X or Pius X Secular Institute (ISPX), is a Roman Catholic men's Clerical Secular Institute of Consecrated Life of Diocesan Right headquartered in Charlesbourg, Quebec City, Canada.

History 
It was established by Henri Roy in 1939 in Manchester, New Hampshire. A secular institute is an organization of individuals who are consecrated persons (professing the evangelical counsels of chastity, poverty and obedience) and live in the world, unlike members of a religious institute, who live in community.

Superiors general 
(incomplete?; so far, Latin Church Canadians) 
 Henri Roy, founder 
 General Director Gérald Cyprien Lacroix (later Cardinal, see below) (2001 – 2009.04.07)
 General Director Christian Beaulieu (2010 – ...)

Prelates from their ranks 
 Gérald Cyprien Lacroix, General Director (see above), then Titular Bishop of Hilta (2009.04.07 – 2011.02.22) & Auxiliary Bishop of Quebec City (Canada) (2009.04.07 – 2011.02.22), promoted Metropolitan Archbishop of Québec (Canada) (2011.02.22 – ...), created Cardinal-Priest of S. Giuseppe all’Aurelio (2014)

References

External links 
 

Secular institutes